The 1986 Maine gubernatorial election took place on November 4, 1986. Incumbent Democratic Governor Joseph Brennan was term limited and ineligible to seek re-election.  First district Congressman John McKernan defeated Democratic Party challenger James Tierney as well as former Republican turned Independent Sherry Huber and former Portland, Maine city manager John Menario, making McKernan the first Republican to win The Blaine House since 1966. William Diamond unsuccessfully ran for the Democratic nomination.

The three main issues during the campaign were: the future of the Maine Yankee Nuclear Power Plant in Wiscasset, economic development and McKernan's congressional record.

Maine Yankee
The future of the Power Plant had been placed up for  statewide referendum in 1980 and again in 1982. McKernan and Menario opposed the closure of Maine Yankee, while Tierney and Huber supported the efforts to close the Plant in 1988.

General election

Candidates
John R. McKernan (Republican), former U.S. Representative from the 1st congressional district
James Tierney (Democratic), incumbent Attorney General of Maine
Sherry Huber (Independent), former state representative
John Menario (Independent), banker and city administrator

Results

References

1986
Maine
Gubernatorial